David Catherwood (born 7 May 1956) is a Northern Irish composer and conductor, with both vocal and choral works currently in print.

Biography
David Catherwood was born in Belfast, Northern Ireland and joined the Salvation Army at the age of seven through its Young People's work.  He studied music at Queen's University of Belfast, gaining a B.Mus.(Hons) degree, and is currently Composer-in-Residence at Campbell College in Belfast, having been previously Director of Music at the college for over 20 years.

Music
He was Bandmaster at the Salvation Army's Belfast Temple (1979–89 & 2018–present), Bandmaster of the Ireland Divisional Youth Band (1989–93), Songster Leader at Belfast Temple (1993–94), and Bandmaster at Belfast Sydenham (1997-01).

He was involved with music camps in Ireland for many years and in recent years has been guest at many music camps in Canada including Roblin Lake Camp, Camp Newport and Camp Selkirk in Ontario, and the Pine Lake Camp in Alberta.  He has spent many summers as a guest of music camps in Texas, Florida and Pennsylvania.

The New York Staff band, Williams Fairey Band, the ISB, and the Canadian, Chicago and Amsterdam Staff bands have recorded Catherwood's music.  Soloists who have featured Catherwood's solos on their CDs include cornet virtuosi David Daws, Roger Webster, Philip Smith and Gordon Ward, and euphonium players Derick Kane and Steven Mead.

Personal life
David Catherwood is married to Wilma Catherwood. They are soldiers at the Belfast Temple corps of The Salvation Army where David leads the band.

References

1956 births
Living people
Musicians from Belfast
Composers from Northern Ireland
Classical composers from Northern Ireland
20th-century classical composers
Salvationists from Northern Ireland
Male classical composers from Northern Ireland
20th-century male musicians